In Greek mythology, Kleodora or Cleodora ("Glorious Gift", in reference to her gift of prophecy) was one of the prophetic Thriae, nymphs who divined the future by throwing stones or pebbles and were associated with the Oracle of Delphi. She and her sisters Melaina and Daphnis lived on Mount Parnassus, where Delphi is located. With Poseidon (or Kleopompos), she was the mother of Parnassos, who created a method of telling the future using birds and founded the main city on Mt. Parnassus. Kleodora's father was Cephissus, a river god of northern Boeotia. 

As a member of the Thriae, Kleodora is often conflated with the bee maidens of the Homeric Hymn to Hermes, from whom Apollo directs Hermes to learn prophecy.

Notes

Reference 

 Pausanias, Description of Greece with an English Translation by W.H.S. Jones, Litt.D., and H.A. Ormerod, M.A., in 4 Volumes. Cambridge, MA, Harvard University Press; London, William Heinemann Ltd. 1918. . Online version at the Perseus Digital Library
 Pausanias, Graeciae Descriptio. 3 vols. Leipzig, Teubner. 1903.  Greek text available at the Perseus Digital Library.

External links
http://www.theoi.com/Nymphe/NympheKleodora.html

Thriae
Women of Poseidon